The 1976 Virginia Slims of Dallas was a women's tennis tournament played on indoor carpet courts at the Moody Coliseum in Dallas,[Texas that was part of the 1976 Virginia Slims World Championship Series. It was the fifth edition of the tournament, held from March 15 through March 21, 1976. First-seeded Evonne Goolagong Cawley won the singles title and earned $15,000 in first-prize money.

Finals

Singles
 Evonne Goolagong Cawley defeated  Martina Navratilova 6–1, 6–1

Doubles
 Mona Schallau /  Ann Kiyomura defeated  Marita Redondo /  Greer Stevens 6–3, 4–6, 6–4

Prize money

References

External links
 Women's Tennis Association (WTA) tournament details

Virginia Slims of Dallas
Virginia Slims of Dallas
Virginia Slims of Dallas
Dallas
Dallas
Virginia Slims of Dallas